A Hole in the Wall (French: Un trou dans le mur) is a 1930 French comedy film directed by René Barberis and starring Jean Murat, Dolly Davis and Marguerite Moreno. It was made at the Joinville Studios near Paris by the French subsidiary of the American company Paramount Pictures. Separate Spanish and Swedish-language versions were made, the Spanish known as A Lucky Man and directed by Benito Perojo.

It was based on a play by Yves Mirande which was remade as a 1950 film of the same title.

Cast
 Jean Murat as André de Kerdrec 
 Dolly Davis as Lucie  
 Marguerite Moreno as Arthémise  
 Léon Belières as Le comte de Corbin 
 Pierre Brasseu as Anatole  
 Suzanne Dehelly as La couturière  
 Lucien Callamand as Le jardinier 
 Charles Lamy as L'antiquaire  
 Fanny Clair

References

Bibliography
 Bentley, Bernard. A Companion to Spanish Cinema. Boydell & Brewer 2008.

External links 

1930 films
1930 comedy films
French comedy films
1930s French-language films
Films directed by René Barberis
Paramount Pictures films
Films shot at Joinville Studios
French black-and-white films
French multilingual films
French films based on plays
1930 multilingual films
1930s French films